The Shake the Cage Tour, by the Anglo-American rock group Fleetwood Mac, began on September 30, 1987, in Kansas City, Missouri, and ended on June 28, 1988, in Manchester, England. It was their first tour since 1974 without Lindsey Buckingham, who left the band in August 1987.

History of the tour 
Although the album Tango in the Night included Lindsey Buckingham, the guitarist quit at a band meeting to discuss the tour. "We'd signed the contracts," Stevie Nicks noted. "We couldn't call in and say, 'Oh, we can't do the tour.' We had to do it, or Fleetwood Mac would have been sued forever."

Buckingham was replaced by rockabilly singer and guitarist Billy Burnette and lead guitarist and session musician Rick Vito. The former contributed to Mick Fleetwood's solo album I'm Not Me, as a member of Mick Fleetwood's Zoo. Recently recovered from cocaine addiction, Nicks was prescribed a heavy duty tranquilizer, to which she became addicted until the mid 1990s.

The band played at the Rock am Ring Festival in Nürburg, West Germany, on June 4, 1988. The crowd in attendance was 80.000.

This tour was filmed during the San Francisco shows (December 12–13) and released on VHS as Fleetwood Mac: Tango in the Night. Cruzados and The Adventures were the opening act of the tour.

Set list 
 Say You Love Me
 The Chain
 Dreams
 Isn't It Midnight
 Everywhere
 Oh Well
 Seven Wonders
 Rattlesnake Shake
 Over My Head
 Gold Dust Woman
 Don't Let Me Down Again (Buckingham Nicks cover)
 Has Anyone Ever Written Anything for You? (Stevie Nicks song)
 I Loved Another Woman
 Brown Eyes
 World Turning
 Little Lies
 Stand Back (Stevie Nicks song)
 You Make Loving Fun
 Go Your Own Way
Encore:
 Blue Letter
 Don't Stop
 Songbird

Tour dates

Personnel 
 Mick Fleetwood – drums, percussion
 John McVie – bass guitar
 Christine McVie – Hammond B3 Organ, Yamaha KX88, piano, maracas, vocals
 Rick Vito – lead guitar, vocals
 Billy Burnette – rhythm guitar, vocals
 Stevie Nicks – vocals, tambourine
Additional Personnel
 Dan Garfield – keyboards, samples
 Isaac Asanté – percussion
 Lori Perry-Nicks – backing vocals
 Elisecia Wright – backing vocals
 Sharon Celani – backing vocals

Certifications

References 

1987 concert tours
1988 concert tours
Fleetwood Mac concert tours